Bugulma Airport  is an airport in Tatarstan, Russia located 12 km north of Bugulma.  It is a small airport with several hangars, servicing small prop transports.  The 2000 m runway was constructed in 2000–2001. Western pilots need permission and a Russian Navigator, since Bugulma is a Russian language only airport.

Ak Bars Aero had its head office on the airport property.

Airlines and destinations

References

External links
 Bugulma Airport Homepage 

Airports built in the Soviet Union
Airports in Tatarstan
Airports established in 2001